Camille Bourniquel (7 March 1918 – 1 April 2013) was a French poet, novelist and painter.

Life 
Born in Paris, Bourniquel became friends with the poets and painters of his generation, François Baron-Renouard, Bazaine, Bertholle, Elvire Jan, Hartung, Jean Le Moal, Manessier, Pignon, Singier. He wrote prefaces, articles and numerous columns in art journals.

Bourniquel joined the magazine Esprit in 1946 and became its literary director in 1957.

In 1963 he wrote the texts of three art films about his painter friends and in 2004 donated works by Manessier (L’Homme à la branche, 1942 ; Composition bleue, 1942; Printemps, 1968; Cheminée au Bignon, 1945), Elvire Jan (L’atelier II, 1942) and Singier (Enfant jouant aux cubes, 1943) to  the musée Unterlinden of Colmar.

Bourniquel died in Paris at age 95.

Laureates 
 Prix du Renouveau in 1953 for Retour à Cirgue. 
 Plume d'or du Figaro littéraire in 1966 for Le Lac.
 Prix Médicis in 1970 for Sélinonte ou la Chambre impériale.
 Grand prix du roman de l'Académie française in 1977 for Tempo (novel).
 Prix Chateaubriand in 1981 for L'Empire Sarkis.

Bibliography 
Le Moal, Manessier, Singier, Paris, 1946.
Quatrains, Burins de Singier, Éditions de la Galerie Biliet-Caputo, Paris, 1949.
Retour à Cirgue, novel, Le Seuil, Paris, 1953 (Prix du Renouveau).
Le Blé sauvage, novel, Le Seuil, Paris, 1955.
Irlande,  "Petite Planète", Le Seuil, Paris, 1955.
Chopin, Microcosme "Solfèges", Le Seuil, Paris, 1957.
Les Abois, novel, Le Seuil, Paris, 1957.
L'Été des solitudes, novel, Le Seuil, Paris, 1960.
Le Lac, novel, Le Seuil, Paris, 1964 (Golden feather of le Figaro littéraire). , Paris, 2000. 
La Maison verte, short stories, Le Seuil, Paris, 1966.
Les Gardiens, theatre, Le Seuil, Paris, 1969.
Sélinonte ou la Chambre impériale, Le Seuil, Paris, 1970 (Prix Médicis) .
Sentier d'Hermès, poems, 21 drawings by Alfred Manessier, Galanis, Paris, 1971.
L'Enfant dans la cité des ombres, Grasset, Paris, 1973.
La Constellation des lévriers, novel, Le Seuil, Paris, 1975.
Rencontre, series Idée Fixe, Julliard, Paris, 1976.
Tempo, novel, Paris, Julliard, 1977 (Grand prix du roman de l'Académie française) .
L'Enfant dans la cité des ombres, seven lithographs by Manessier, Le Livre contemporain & les Bibliophiles Franco-Suisses, Paris, 1978.
Le Soleil sur la rade, novel, Julliard, Paris, 1979.
L'Empire Sarkis, novel, Julliard, Paris, 1981 (Prix Chateaubriand).
Le Jugement dernier, novel, Julliard, Paris, 1983.
Elvire Jan, Éditions Guitardes, Paris, 1984.
Le Manège d'hiver, novel, Julliard, Paris, 1986.
Le Jardin des délices, Paris, Mercure de France, 1987.
La Féerie et le royaume, original lithographs by Marc Chagall, Mourlot, Paris.
Karma, tale, Éditions de Fallois, Paris, 1999.
Queen Alicia, novel, Éditions de Fallois, Paris, 2004 .
Poèmes, Éditions de Fallois, Paris, 2004.
Paul Valéry, Dernier dîner à Auteuil, 2009

References

External links 
 Camille Bourniquel : réapprendre à vivre

20th-century French non-fiction writers
20th-century French novelists
Prix Médicis winners
French art critics
French military personnel of World War II
1918 births
Writers from Paris
2013 deaths
Grand Prix du roman de l'Académie française winners